Tyler Hill is a small village on the northern outskirts of Canterbury, Kent in England. The population is included in the civil parish of Hackington.

Its name derives from the useful clay soils that are abundant in the area.

Geography
It has a rural setting being surrounded by fields and the Ancient Forest of Blean.

Economy
The village is small, consisting of a Public House, a village hall and a farm.

Villages in Kent
City of Canterbury